The 2021 Praia Basketball League was the inaugural season of the Praia Basketball League, the first-ever professional basketball league in Cape Verde. The league existed of 6 teams all located in the city of Praia.

The 2021 season was scheduled to begin on June 3, 2021, but was moved to July due to the COVID-19 pandemic. On July 24, 2021, the Plateau Warriors won the inaugural title.

Teams

Draft 
The inaugural draft was held on May 18, 2021.

Teams

Regular season

Playoffs

Individual awards 

 Finals MVP: Joshua Yorke-Frazer (Plateau Warriors)
 All-Cape Verdean Team:
 Alexis Miranda
 Brady Fernandes
 Joel de Luz
 Nilton Gomes
 Aaron Strothers
 All-Import Team:
 Nasir Core
 Joshua Yorke-Frazer
 Rodriques Palmer
 Allex Austin
 Malik Miller

Statistics

References 

Basketball in Cape Verde
2021 in African basketball